Paraplatyptilia albidorsellus is a moth of the family Pterophoridae. It is found in North America (including California, Alberta and British Columbia).

The head and thorax are white, with a few scattered fuscous scales. The legs are whitish tinged with cinereous and the feet and spurs are paler. The forewings are white, thickly sprinkled with brown, forming a widening streak from the base of the wing to the triangular patch, beyond which it is paler and crossed by a white costal patch and a white line near the outer margin and parallel to it. The fringes are ashy, with a brown line at the base. The hindwings are white, thickly dusted with brown. The fringes are paler brown and much paler at the base.

References

Moths described in 1880
albidorsellus